Denton is a village and civil parish in the English county of Norfolk. Denton is located 3.8 miles north-east of Harleston and 13 miles south of Norwich.

It is a very active community as can be seen on its Website - see link in box on right.

History
Denton's name is of Anglo-Saxon origin and derives from the Old English for an enclosed farmstead or settlement in a valley.

In the Domesday Book, Denton is listed as a settlement of 49 households in the hundred of Earsham. In 1086, the village was divided between the estates of King William I and Eudo, son of Spirewic.

The village boundaries include the remaining earthworks of Denton Castle which was likely built in 1088 by William d'Albini and subsequently abandoned in 1254. Today, the castle is a scheduled monument and in the ownership of the National Trust.

Geography
According to the 2011 Census, Denton has a population of 326 residents living in 149 households.

Denton falls within the constituency of South Norfolk and is represented at Parliament by Richard Bacon MP of the Conservative Party.

St. Mary's Church
Denton's parish church is of Norman origin and dedicated to Saint Mary. The church tower holds evidence of three major rebuilding efforts, the most notable in the Eighteenth Century in the Tudor Perpendicular Style. The stained glass dates back to the Medieval period, with some examples installed by Le Grys Manfylde in the mid-Sixteenth Century.

Village Life
Despite its small population, Denton has an extremely active community and even won the 2008 Pride in Norfolk Award for a village under 500 people in population. The village went on to win the 2009 Calor Village of the Year Competition.

War Memorial
Denton war memorial takes the form of a carved marble plaque inside St. Mary's Church. It lists the following names for the First World War:
 Second-Lieutenant John W. C. Bolland, 10th Battalion, Royal Norfolk Regiment
 Leading-Seaman John Davison (1889-1915), HMS Princess Irene
 Corporal Ernest R. Wooltorton (1888-1915), 2nd Battalion, Royal Norfolk Regiment
 Lance-Corporal John J. Revell (d.1918), 1st Battalion, Dorset Regiment
 Private William E. Aldrich (d.1918), 4th Battalion, Bedfordshire Regiment
 Private Benjamin C. Grimmer (1886-1917), 5th Battalion, Royal Berkshire Regiment
 Private Henry W. Beckett (1891-1917), 17th Battalion, Middlesex Regiment
 Private Charles E. W. Oakley (d.1916), 1st Battalion, Royal Norfolk Regiment
 Private John Nobbs (d.1917), 11th Battalion, Royal Sussex Regiment
 Private Samuel Barnes (1886-1916), 9th Battalion, Worcestershire Regiment

And, the following for the Second World War:
 Sapper Jack E. Sheldrake (d.1941), Royal Engineers

References

External links
 

Denton, Norfolk
Villages in Norfolk
Civil parishes in Norfolk